Thomas J. O'Malley (1868 – May 27, 1936) was a Wisconsin politician.  He was born in Menasha, Wisconsin in 1868.  He initially worked in the railway industry, eventually becoming a passenger conductor for the North Western Railroad. He was active in the railway union, and in 1932 he became the first Democrat elected the 26th Lieutenant Governor of Wisconsin in nearly forty years.  He served two terms, from 1933 until 1936, despite falling out of favor with his party during his first term.  He planned to run for governor, but died of a heart attack in 1936 in Hot Springs, Arkansas.

References

 
 

1868 births
1936 deaths
Lieutenant Governors of Wisconsin
Wisconsin Democrats
People from Menasha, Wisconsin
Place of death missing